Telus World of Science  may refer to:
 Telus World of Science (Edmonton)
 Calgary Science Centre, known as Telus World of Science 2005–2011
 Science World (Vancouver), known as Science World at the Telus World of Science 2005–2020